The 2010–11 Caribbean Twenty20 season was the second season of the Caribbean Twenty20, a domestic Twenty20 tournament administrated by the West Indies Cricket Board. The season began on 10 January 2011, six months after the 2010 tournament, and concluded with the final on 23 January. The tournament was moved to be considerably earlier than the Champions League Twenty20, for which the best performing domestic team will qualify. The move also gives preferable weather conditions, as many matches were affected by rain in 2010. The tournament had ten participating teams, featuring all eight from the 2010 season and the addition of the winners and runners-up of the 2010 Friends Provident t20 – England's domestic Twenty20 tournament.

Trinidad and Tobago won the tournament and qualified for the qualifying stage of the 2011 Champions League Twenty20. They defeated Hampshire in the final. Jamaica came third and Windward Islands came fourth.

Venues 
All matches were played at the following two grounds:

Format 
The tournament consisted of 24 matches, and was divided into a group stage and a knockout stage. If a match ended in a tie, a Super Over was to be played to determine the winner. The group stage had the teams divided into two equal groups, with each playing a round-robin tournament. The top two teams of each group advanced to the knockout stage. The knockout stage consisted of two semi-finals, a third-place playoff and the grand final. The semi-finals had the top team of one group facing the second from the other. The winners of the semi-finals played in the grand final to determine the winner of the competition, while the losers of the semi-finals played in the third-place playoff.

Points in the group stage were awarded as follows:

Teams 
The following teams participated in the tournament. Hampshire and Somerset were the winners and runners-up of the 2010 Friends Provident t20 which meant they were invited to play in the tournament.

Group A
  Combined Campuses and Colleges
  Windward Islands
 
 
  Somerset†

Group B
 †
  Hampshire†
 
  Leeward Islands
 

†Invited overseas team

Results

Group stage

Group A

Group B

Knockout stage

Fixtures 
All times shown are in Eastern Caribbean Time (UTC−04).

Group stage

Group A

Group B

Knockout stage 
Semi-finals

Third-place playoff

Final

Statistics

Highest team totals 
The following table listed the six highest team scores during this season.

Last Updated 24 January 2011.

Most runs 
The top five highest run scorers (total runs) in the season are included in this table.

Last Updated 24 January 2011.

Highest scores 
This table contains the top five highest scores of the season made by a batsman in a single innings.

Last Updated 24 January 2011.

Most wickets 
The following table contains the five leading wicket-takers of the season.

Last Updated 24 January 2011.

Best bowling figures 
This table lists the top five players with the best bowling figures in the season.

Last Updated 24 January 2011.

References

External links 
 Official Caribbean T20 website 
 CricInfo Caribbean T20 2010/11 website

C
Caribbean Twenty20
2010–11 West Indian cricket season
Caribbean Twenty20